Grant Judson Smith (January 13, 1869 – December 7, 1947) was a professional baseball player. He played all or part of four seasons in Major League Baseball for the Cincinnati Reds (1893), St. Louis Browns (1893), Pittsburgh Pirates (1896 and 1901) and Washington Senators (1898), primarily as a third baseman.

Smith, who was born in Green Oak, Michigan, was a member of the Pirates team that won the 1901 National League pennant.

In 4 seasons he played in 103 games and had 346 at bats, 48 runs, 97 hits, 11 doubles, 6 triples, 4 home runs, 37 RBI, 15 stolen bases, 37 walks, .280 batting average, .363 on-base percentage, .382 slugging percentage and 132 total bases.

He went to college at Ohio State University.

He died in Los Angeles at the age of 78.

Sources

Major League Baseball third basemen
Cincinnati Reds players
St. Louis Browns (NL) players
Pittsburgh Pirates players
Washington Senators (1891–1899) players
Wheeling (minor league baseball) players
Portland (minor league baseball) players
La Grande Grand Rhonders players
Butte (minor league baseball) players
Wilkes-Barre Coal Barons players
Binghamton Bingoes players
Grand Rapids Rippers players
Jacksonville Jacks players
Buffalo Bisons (minor league) players
Toronto Canucks players
Toronto Canadians players
Albany Senators players
Syracuse Stars (minor league baseball) players
Toronto Maple Leafs (International League) players
Worcester Farmers players
Providence Clamdiggers (baseball) players
Providence Grays (minor league) players
Columbus Senators players
Toledo Mud Hens players
Los Angeles Angels (minor league) players
Fresno (minor league baseball) players
Portland Beavers players
19th-century baseball players
Baseball players from Michigan
1869 births
1947 deaths
Ohio State Buckeyes baseball players
People from Livingston County, Michigan